Martin Schaetzle is an American former college football coach. He served as the head football coach at Mercyhurst University in Erie, Pennsylvania from 2002 to 2021, compiling a record of 97–114.

Schaetzle played high school football at St. Francis Preparatory School in Queens and college football at Bucknell University in Lewisburg, Pennsylvania. He was co-captain of the 1982 Bucknell Bison football team. After graduating from Bucknell in 1983, Schaetzle earned a master's degree in business education at University at Albany, SUNY, where he also worked as an assistant football coach.  He was a graduate assistant at the University of Arizona from 1984 to 1985 before moving to Sonoma State University in 1986 as an assistant football coach. Schaetzle spent 1989 as offensive line coach at Northern Arizona University. He returned to Pennsylvania when he was hired in March 19 as an assistant coach at Shippensburg University of Pennsylvania under head football coach Rocky Rees.

Head coaching record

References

External links
 Mercyhurst profile

Year of birth missing (living people)
Living people
American football offensive linemen
Baseball catchers
Albany Great Danes football coaches
Arizona Wildcats football coaches
Bucknell Bison baseball players
Bucknell Bison football coaches
Bucknell Bison football players
Mercyhurst Lakers football coaches
Northern Arizona Lumberjacks football coaches
Shippensburg Red Raiders football coaches
Sonoma State Cossacks football coaches
St. Francis Preparatory School alumni
University at Albany, SUNY alumni
Sportspeople from Brooklyn
Players of American football from New York City
Coaches of American football from New York (state)
Baseball players from New York (state)